Rome is an album written by the American music producer Danger Mouse and the Italian composer Daniele Luppi. The album took five years to make and was inspired by the music from Spaghetti Westerns.

The album was recorded using vintage equipment and, as well as featuring musicians who recorded Spaghetti Western soundtracks, also features a reunited Cantori Moderni – the choir put together by Alessandro Alessandroni – that performed on the soundtrack to The Good, the Bad and the Ugly. The album also includes vocals by the American singers Jack White on the tracks "The Rose with the Broken Neck", "Two Against One" and "The World", and Norah Jones on the tracks "Season's Trees", "Black" and "Problem Queen". White additionally chose to provide lyrics for his three songs.

Track listing

Charts

Credits

Musicians
Gegè Munari - Drums and percussion
Dario Rosciglione - Upright and electric bass
Luciano Ciccaglioni - Acoustic and electric guitars
Antonello Vannucchi - Celesta, harpsichord, organ and piano
Roberto Podio - Percussion
Gilda Buttà - Celesta and harpsichord
Cantori Moderni - Choir
Edda Dell'Orso - Soprano vocals
Jack White - Vocals ("The Rose with a Broken Neck", "Two Against One" and "The World")
Norah Jones - Vocals ("Season's Trees", "Black" and "Problem Queen")

Recording and arrangements
Danger Mouse - Production, arrangements, mixing
Daniele Luppi - Production, arrangements, mixing, orchestra and choir conductor
Fabio Patrignani - Engineer, mixing

Usage in other media
 An interactive web film, Rome: 3 Dreams of Black, was created for the song "Black" by Chris Milk with Aaron Koblin, using HTML5 technology including WebGL as part of Chrome Experiments. 
 The song "Black" accompanied the ending of "Face Off", the final episode of Breaking Bads fourth season.
 The song "Two Against One" peaked number 20 in Billboard Alternative Songs chart and was included on the soundtrack for 2 Guns, the 2013 film directed by Baltasar Kormákur. In 2015, the track was also used for an advertisement of long-running British soap opera Emmerdale to promote the show's big Summer Fate storyline.

References

External links 
 

Danger Mouse (musician) albums
2011 albums
Norah Jones albums
Jack White albums
Capitol Records albums
Albums produced by Danger Mouse (musician)
Parlophone albums
EMI Records albums
Lex Records albums
Third Man Records albums